Sveinsson is a patronymic (föðurnöfn, “fathername”) in Icelandic, meaning son of Sveinn. In Icelandic names, a föðurnöfn is not a surname. The name refers to:
Ásmundur Sveinsson (1893–1982), Icelandic sculptor
Atli Heimir Sveinsson (b. 1938), Icelandic composer
Brynjólfur Sveinsson (1605–1675), Icelandic Lutheran clergyman; bishop of Skálholt; his face is on the 1000 kronur note
Einar Sveinsson (1906–1973), Icelandic architect
Jakob Jóhann Sveinsson (b. 1982), Icelandic Olympic swimmer
Jón Sveinsson (1857–1944), Icelandic Jesuit and author of children’s stories
Kjartan Sveinsson (b. 1978), Icelandic multi-instrumental musician

Surnames